Hubert Klyne Headley (1906–1996) was an American composer, pianist and organist.

Early life and education
Headley was born in West Virginia in 1906. When he was six his mother, an organist, moved the family to California. At ten years old he was introduced to Maurice Ravel, whose music had a strong effect on him. He studied music at the University of the Pacific, graduating in 1928, and then at the Eastman School of Music until 1937.

Career 
From 1939 to 1954 Headley taught at the University of Santa Barbara. During that time he succeeded Maurice Faulkner as conductor of the University of California Symphony Orchestra in Santa Barbara, becoming known both as a composer and as a pianist and giving concerts in which he conducted his own works, for example in Paris, London, Budapest and Prague. After 1954 he moved to Seattle to teach at the Cornish School of Applied Arts.

Death and legacy 
After a short period in Seattle, Headley moved to Vancouver. He also moved to Sudbury, Ontario, Canada where he developed the music program at Cambrian College in the late 60's and early 70's. He left for Vancouver where he remained until his death. His music is today virtually unknown, and many of his works are lost. In 2006 his music resurfaced by accident. Robert Buckley, one of his students, and Stan MacDaniel took joint responsibility for the recordings of his music in 2007.

In 2006, for the 100th anniversary of Headley's birth, Russian State TV performed several of its compositions, including the California Suite, conducted by Dmitry Yablonsky, a conductor who has focussed on bringing forgotten or unknown music to audiences. After this, the Naxos record label published a CD of Headley's music in an "American Classics" series.

Compositions (selection) 
Orchestral
 1939 California Suite, for orchestra (composed for the inauguration of the 1939 Golden Gate Exposition in San Francisco)
 Golden Gate
 Yosemite
 Fiesta
 1941 Concerto No. 1 (Argentango), for piano and orchestra
 1945 Concerto No. 2, for piano and orchestra
 1946 Symphony No. 1 (for Radio), for orchestra
 1950 Symphony No. 2 (Prelude to a Man), for soprano, alto, tenor, bass solo, mixed chorus, speaking chorus, orchestra and ballet (also known as: Prelude to Man, a symphonic cycle in four parts) – text: Chard Powers Smith

Operas
 1946 Noche Serena
 1961-1962 The darkened city, opera in 3 acts – libretto: Robert Glynn Kelly

Choral
 1968 Peace, for orchestra and children's choir

Chamber
 1954 Sonate, for cello and piano
 1954 Sonata Ibérica, for cello and piano
 1957 Quintet in two parts, for piano, strings and clarinet
 Septet, for winds and strings

Sources
 "My Musical Background" Stan McDaniel
 Publication Naxos 2008: Album description, Album review.

1906 births
1996 deaths
American male classical composers
American classical composers
American male conductors (music)
American classical pianists
American male classical pianists
20th-century classical composers
American opera composers
Male opera composers
Musicians from West Virginia
University of the Pacific (United States) alumni
Eastman School of Music alumni
University of California, Santa Barbara faculty
20th-century American conductors (music)
20th-century classical pianists
20th-century American pianists
20th-century American composers
20th-century American male musicians